Plantation Island is a census-designated place (CDP) in Collier County, Florida, United States. The population was 163 at the 2010 census. It is part of the Naples–Marco Island Metropolitan Statistical Area.

Geography
Plantation Island is located in southern Collier County at  (25.846346, -81.368274), along Halfway Creek upstream several thousand feet from Chokoloskee Bay.  Plantation Island is near a northwest point of Everglades National Park and a southwest point of Big Cypress National Preserve. It is south of Everglades City and north of Chokoloskee via State Road 29.

From the canal-lined lots on Plantation Island, it is a short boat ride down Halfway Creek, across Chokoloskee Bay, through the Ten Thousand Islands and out into the Gulf of Mexico. Plantation Island is located within the Big Cypress Area of Critical State Concern.

Plantation Island, Florida has a Tropical climate.

Demographics

2020 census

As of the 2020 United States census, there were 119 people, 14 households, and 0 families residing in the CDP.

2000 census
As of the census of 2000, there were 202 people, 92 households, and 57 families residing in the CDP. The racial makeup of the CDP was 96.53% White. Hispanic or Latino of any race were 3.47% of the population.

There were 92 households, out of which 18.5% had children under the age of 18 living with them, 54.3% were married couples living together, 3.3% had a female householder with no husband present, and 38.0% were non-families. 28.3% of all households were made up of individuals, and 9.8% had someone living alone who was 65 years of age or older.  The average household size was 2.20 and the average family size was 2.65.

In the CDP, the population was spread out, with 14.4% under the age of 18, 9.4% from 18 to 24, 21.3% from 25 to 44, 32.7% from 45 to 64, and 22.3% who were 65 years of age or older.  The median age was 48 years. For every 100 females, there were 104.0 males.  For every 100 females age 18 and over, there were 119.0 males.

The median income for a household in the CDP was $38,750, and the median income for a family was $45,208. Males had a median income of $31,667 versus $30,833 for females. The per capita income for the CDP was $21,581.  About 13.8% of families and 14.6% of the population were below the poverty line, including none of those under the age of eighteen and 11.4% of those 65 or over.

References

Census-designated places in Collier County, Florida
Census-designated places in Florida
Populated coastal places in Florida on the Gulf of Mexico